Ronald Gray (4 August 1932 – 17 August 2019) was an Australian athlete. He competed in the men's triple jump at the 1956 Summer Olympics.

References

1932 births
2019 deaths
Athletes (track and field) at the 1956 Summer Olympics
Australian male triple jumpers
Olympic athletes of Australia
Place of birth missing